Tomislav Brkić and Ante Pavić were the defending champions but chose not to defend their title.

Vijay Sundar Prashanth and Ramkumar Ramanathan won the title after defeating Hsieh Cheng-peng and Yang Tsung-hua 7–6(7–3), 6–7(5–7), [10–7] in the final.

Seeds

Draw

References
 Main Draw

KPIT MSLTA Challenger - Doubles
2018 Doubles